The Australasian Mediterranean Sea is a mediterranean sea located in the area between Southeast Asia and Australasia. It connects the Indian and Pacific oceans. It has a maximum depth of 7,440 m and a surface area of 9.08 mil. km².

Geography 

In contrast to the American Mediterranean Sea and Mediterranean Sea it is not surrounded  It includes the following seas:

 South China Sea - 3.5 million km² 
 Banda Sea - 695,000 km²
 Arafura sea - 650,000 km²
 Timor Sea - 610,000 km²
 Java Sea - 320,000 km²
 Gulf of Thailand - 320,000 km²
 Gulf of Carpentaria - 300,000 km²
 Celebes Sea - 280,000 km²
 Sulu Sea - 260,000 km²
 Flores Sea - 240,000 km²
 Molucca Sea - 200,000 km²
 Gulf of Tonkin - 126,250 km²
 Halmahera Sea - 95,000 km²
 Bali Sea - 45,000 km²
 Savu Sea - 35,000 km²
 Joseph Bonaparte Gulf - 26,780 km²
 Seram Sea - 12,000 km²
 Straits of Johor
 Lombok Strait
 Luzon Strait
 Makassar Strait
 Strait of Malacca
 Qiongzhou Strait
 Singapore Strait
 Taiwan Strait
 Sunda Strait

States or territories with a coast on the Australasian Mediterranean Sea are: Australia, Brunei, China, Indonesia, Cambodia, Malaysia, Papua New Guinea, Philippines, Singapore, Taiwan, Thailand, Timor-Leste and Vietnam. It includes the straits of Malacca, Singapore and Luzon, and adjoins the peninsulas of Indochina and Malaysia. The following islands are located within it:
 Bathurst Island, Groote Eylandt, Hainan Dao, Phú Quốc, Ko Chang, Samui archipelago, Nang Yuan, Ko Phangan, Ko Samui, Ko Tao, Tioman, Melville islands, Maluka islands, New Guinea, Paracel Islands, Pratas Island, Philippines, Riau, Sangir Archipelago, Spratly Islands, Greater Sunda Islands (Borneo, Sumatra, Java, Sulawesi), Lesser Sunda Islands (Bali, Flores, Komodo Islands, Lombok, Sumba, Sumbawa, Timor), Taiwan, and Talaud Islands.

See also 
 East Indian Archipelago
 Maritime Southeast Asia

References

Marginal seas of the Indian Ocean
Marginal seas of the Pacific Ocean
Wallacea
Mediterranean